The 1978 Taça de Portugal Final was the final match of the 1977–78 Taça de Portugal, the 38th season of the Taça de Portugal, the premier Portuguese football cup competition organized by the Portuguese Football Federation (FPF). The final was played at the Estádio Nacional in Oeiras, and opposed two Primeira Liga sides Porto and Sporting CP. As the inaugural final match finished 1–1, the final was replayed a week later at the same venue with the Leões defeating the Portistas 2–1 to claim a tenth Taça de Portugal.

Match

Details

Replay

Details

References

1978
Taca
FC Porto matches
Sporting CP matches